Polypyrenula is a genus of fungi in the family Pyrenulaceae.

References

External links
Polypyrenula at Index Fungorum

Pyrenulales
Taxa named by David Leslie Hawksworth
Eurotiomycetes genera